William Roy Cousins was a Texas Democratic politician and a member of the Texas Senate from 1913 and 1934. He also served as a school superintendent before becoming a county magistrate judge. He left the bench and entered into private practice in 1934 and worked as an attorney until his death in 1976.

Family 

Cousins had two sons, Wilfred Roy Cousins (who would eventually succeed him as a state senator) and Weldon Cousins, who served the state of Louisiana as an assistant Attorney General.

Political career

Texas Senate
Cousins served in the Senate of Texas for 24 years, representing Beaumont and Jefferson Counties.

Among his numerous legislative achievements included the first medical practice act passed in the state of Texas, as well as the creation of the Stephen F. Austin State University in Nacogdoches, Texas, one of four independent public universities in Texas. He also authored and sponsored the bill which authorized the building of the Rainbow Bridge (originally named the Port Arthur-Orange Bridge) between Orange County and Port Arthur.

References 

1976 deaths
1881 births
Texas state senators
Texas state court judges
Texas lawyers
People from Beaumont, Texas
20th-century American politicians
20th-century American judges
20th-century American lawyers